1Z may refer to:

AH-1Z; see H-1 upgrade program
Bell AH-1Z Viper
AH-1Z Super Cobra; see Bell AH-1 SuperCobra
SSH 1Z (WA); see List of former state highways in Washington
A prefix for tracking numbers used by United Parcel Service

See also
Z1 (disambiguation)